Sir Alfred Étienne Jérôme Dupuch, OBE, KSG (16 February 1899 – 23 August 1991) was a Bahamian journalist and politician. He was editor of the Nassau Tribune from 1919 to 1973 and served in the Bahamian House of Assembly for 24 years.

Dupuch was named as 'longest serving newspaper editor' by the Guinness Book of World Records.

Early life

He was born Alfred Etienne Jerome Dupuch to Leon and Harriet (née Saunders) Dupuch. Etienne's mother died in 1909 giving birth to a stillborn daughter. Etienne's father, Leon, founder of the Tribune newspaper, died five years later in 1914 when young Dupuch was 15 years old.

Political life 

Dupuch served as a Member of Parliament in the Bahamian House of Assembly from 1925 to 1942, and from 1949 to 1956.

In 1956, Dupuch, together with his younger brother Eugene, introduced the first comprehensive anti-discrimination legislation in the colony's history, to outlaw racial discrimination in hotels, restaurants and other public places at a time when the country's tourist industry was experiencing dramatic growth.

Dupuch was appointed a Member of the Order of the British Empire (OBE) and was later knighted by Queen Elizabeth II. He also received a papal knighthood from Pope Pius XII (Order of St Gregory the Great).

During his time in office he was opposed to the nascent Progressive Liberal Party believing that Bahamians should pursue a middle way to resolve the political differences that existed at the time between blacks and whites.

Newspaper career 

Dupuch began his newspaper career as a boy by delivering The Tribune on roller-skates through Nassau's 'over the hill' ghetto areas. He took over the editorship after serving as a soldier in the British Army during the First World War.

Dupuch kept faith with the slogan 'Being Bound to Swear to the Dogmas of No Master', used by his father Leon Dupuch when he launched The Tribune as a four-page newspaper in 1903. The slogan was originally used in The Bahamas by John Wells, a loyalist who started the first Bahamian newspaper, The Gazette. His descendant, Lisa Wells founded the first news website in The Bahamas, BahamasB2B.com, in 2000. For years, Dupuch was at odds with Nassau's ruling white élite, the Bay Street Boys, and was hostile to The Duke of Windsor during his five-year rule (1940-1945) as Governor of the Bahamas during the Second World War. Dupuch was known for strong editorials on his political positions.

While Dupuch served as editor, the newspaper published a 1959 book on the 1943 murder of Sir Harry Oakes, which was never solved, with the only trial case finding the defendant, Alfred de Marigny, not guilty.
 
Dupuch's powerful editorials were required reading among 'thinking Bahamians' for many decades. Most prominent Bahamian journalists learned their craft under his tutelage, including Sir Arthur Foulkes, the former Governor-General of the Bahamas from 2012 to 2014.

In the late 1960s, when he retired from the Senate, Dupuch was described by a fellow Senator, Doris Johnson, as 'a pesky pimple on the body politic of the Bahamas' – a quote he insisted on using in The Tribunes headline the following day.

In 1972, aged 73, Dupuch handed control of The Tribune to his daughter Eileen, a qualified barrister and graduate of Columbia University's famous journalism school, who remains publisher to the present day. She is also the head of a media empire that now also includes radio stations.

Among Dupuch's protégés, apart from Sir Arthur Foulkes, were Oswald Brown, who went on to become Managing Editor of both The Nassau Guardian and The Freeport News, and John Marquis, the award-winning British journalist who worked as a political reporter on both The Nassau Guardian and The Tribune in the 1960s, and returned to the Bahamas in 1999 as The Tribunes Managing Editor.

During Marquis's ten years as Managing Editor, The Tribune enjoyed a dramatic surge in circulation. It also became embroiled in a string of controversies. Its exposure of a scandal involving the American cover girl Anna Nicole Smith was blamed for the fall of the Progressive Liberal Party government in 2007.

Like Dupuch before him, Marquis was targeted by mass street protests outside The Tribunes offices.

Dupuch published a 1967 book, The Tribune Story, about his struggle to keep his paper afloat in the face of enormous odds while raising a young family.

The editor-publisher was listed among the three greatest Bahamians of the 20th century in a millennium poll in the year 2000.

Death 

Dupuch died on 23 August 1991, aged 92, after catching fire in his garden at his home in Camperdown, Nassau, Bahamas while trying to destroy an ants' nest.

References

Further reading
Dupuch, Etienne. The Tribune Story. Benn, 1967.

1899 births
1991 deaths
Accidental deaths in the Bahamas
Bahamian newspaper editors
Deaths from fire
Members of the House of Assembly of the Bahamas
Members of the Senate of the Bahamas
People from Nassau, Bahamas
20th-century Bahamian politicians